Aleksey Pershin (born 20 February 1962) is a Soviet racewalker. He competed in the men's 20 kilometres walk at the 1988 Summer Olympics.

References

1962 births
Living people
Athletes (track and field) at the 1988 Summer Olympics
Soviet male racewalkers
Olympic athletes of the Soviet Union
People from Kyzylorda
Goodwill Games medalists in athletics
Competitors at the 1986 Goodwill Games